Uyole is an administrative ward in the Mbeya Urban district of the Mbeya Region of Tanzania. In 2016 the Tanzania National Bureau of Statistics report there were 12,722 people in the ward, from 11,543 in 2012.

Neighborhoods 
The ward has 4 neighborhoods.
 Hasanga
 Ibara
 Iwambala
 Utukuyu

References 

Wards of Mbeya Region